The Gabber Mixes is a 12" remix EP by American heavy metal band Fear Factory, released in 1997 through Mokum Records. The track "T-1000" is from Remanufacture, which is a remix of "H-K (Hunter-Killer)" from Demanufacture.

The remixes were done by (in track list order): Technohead, Chosen Few, DJ Dano and Liza 'n' Eliaz.

Track listing
A-side

B-side

External links 
The Gabber Mixes on Discogs

1997 EPs
Fear Factory EPs
1997 remix albums
Remix EPs
Roadrunner Records remix albums
Roadrunner Records EPs
Heavy metal EPs